Neyveli Utterpradesh Power Limited-Ghatampur Thermal Power Project is an upcoming coal-based thermal power plant located in Ghatampur in Kanpur district, Uttar Pradesh. The power plant is owned by the Neyveli Uttar Pradesh Power Limited a joint venture between Neyveli Lignite Corporation (51%) and Uttar Pradesh Rajya Vidyut Utpadan Nigam (49%).

Status update
 Jan 2015: The land acquisition is completed.
 May 2015: South Pachwara Coal Block allotted to NLC India ltd for GTPS Project. MDO selection under progress 
 Jun 2015: MoEF issued Environment Clearance on 17-Jun-2015 
 Feb 2016: Centre to consider 1,980 MW Ghatampur project in Kanpur soon.
 July 2016: Centre approved for installation of Ghatampur Thermal Power Project (GTPC) of 1980 MW (3 X 660 MW) capacity through a joint venture company named "Neyveli Uttar Pradesh Power Limited (NUPPL)" formed jointly by Neyveli Lignite Corporation Limited (NLC) and Uttar Pradesh Rajya Vidyut Utpadan Nigam Limited (UPRVUNL).Untitled Page
 October 2016: Construction starts 
June 2021 inspection of railway line to power plant by railway DRM

Capacity
The planned capacity of the power plant in 1980 MW. The power plant is secured  with coal supply.

References

External links
 Ghatampur power station at SourceWatch
Ajay Mehrotra being Observer +91-9839100876, https://www.architizer.com/users/ajay-mehrotra/

Coal-fired power stations in Uttar Pradesh
Kanpur Nagar district
2020 establishments in Uttar Pradesh
Energy infrastructure completed in 2020